Ruth Reed Whitaker (December 13, 1936 – November 10, 2014) was a Republican member of the Arkansas State Senate, with service from 2001 to 2013.

Born in Blytheville in Mississippi County, Arkansas, Whitaker graduated from Heber Springs High School in Cleburne County and then attended Hendrix College in Conway, Arkansas. She resided in Fort Smith in Sebastian County and Cedarville in Crawford County. Prior to her election to the state Senate, Whitaker served on the Cedarville City Council.

She died in Fayetteville, Arkansas.

Notes

External links
Arkansas State Legislature-Senator Ruth Whitaker

1936 births
2014 deaths
People from Blytheville, Arkansas
People from Cleburne County, Arkansas
People from Crawford County, Arkansas
Politicians from Fort Smith, Arkansas
Hendrix College alumni
Arkansas city council members
Women state legislators in Arkansas
Republican Party Arkansas state senators
Women city councillors in Arkansas
21st-century American women